Henry Buckingham Witton (October 21, 1831 – November 8, 1921) was an Ontario painter and political figure. He represented Hamilton in the House of Commons of Canada from 1872 to 1874. He ran as a Conservative Labour candidate, but took his seat as a straight  Conservative member following his election in 1872.

Witton was born in South Lopham, Norfolk, England and was educated there as well. In 1860, he married M.A. Palmer. He worked as a master painter at the Great Western Railway Shops in Hamilton, Ontario. Witton ran unsuccessfully for the federal seat in 1874 and 1875 as a Conservative Labour member. Witton was appointed inspector of canals in 1879, and served in that post until 1890. He died in Hamilton at the age of 90.

References

External links
 

1831 births
1921 deaths
Conservative Party of Canada (1867–1942) MPs
Members of the House of Commons of Canada from Ontario